The Best of Jon English is a compilation album released in Australian by RCA Records/BMG. The album was released in May 1993, celebrating the 20th anniversary of his first solo album, Wine Dark Sea. The album peaked at number 68 on the Australian ARIA Charts.

Track listing
CD/ Cassette (74321126802)
 "All Together Now" (Jon English) - 3:02
 "You Might Need Somebody" (Tom Snow, Nan O'Bryne, Chris Gilby) - 3:37
 "Some People (Have All The Fun)" (John Dallimore, English) - 3:51
 "Get Your Love Right" (Alan David, Lionel Martin) - 3:26
 "Hot Town" (Graeme Connors, Mike Wade) - 3:48
 "Handbags and Gladrags" (Mike d'Abo) - 5:19
 "Always the Busker" (English) - 4:25
 "Same Old Feeling Again" (English, S Rattray)- 3:00
 "Carmilla" (English) - 4:01
 "Lay it All Down" (Barry Goldberg, Will Jennings) - 3:35
 "Superstar" (Tim Rice, Andrew Lloyd-Webber) - 3:12
 "She Was Real" (English) - 7:17
 "Turn the Page" (Bob Seger) - 4:30
 "Josephine (Too Many Secrets)" (English, Tim Friese-Greene) - 4:10
 "Loving Arms" (Tom Jans) - 3:02
 "Minutes to Midnight" (English) - 5:02
 "Words Are Not Enough" (Garry Paige, Mark Punch) - 3:31
 "Hollywood Seven" (Gloria Sklerov, Harry Lloyd) - 4:52
 "Six Ribbons" (English) - 3:15

Charts

References

External links

1993 compilation albums
Jon English albums
RCA Records compilation albums
Compilation albums by Australian artists